Konstancja Benisławska (1747–1806) was a Polish poet and writer of religious hymns.

References

1747 births
1806 deaths
Polish songwriters
Christian hymnwriters
Women hymnwriters
Polish women poets
18th-century Polish–Lithuanian poets
18th-century Polish–Lithuanian women writers